Kelar Mound or Kelar Tappeh is a Neolithic archaeological site in Mazandaran Province, Iran. It lies on the Kelardasht plain in the Alborz Mountains. The 10-meter high mound covers an area of 6,000 hectares.  Studies of the carbon-14 remains (coal and bone) have dated the site to 6,000 before present. A cylinder seal recovered at the site depicts a man and a goat.

References

Archaeological sites in Iran
Neolithic settlements
Buildings and structures in Mazandaran Province